Oncideres albomarginata is a species of beetle in the family Cerambycidae. It was described by James Thomson in 1868. It is known from Costa Rica, Ecuador, Colombia, Guatemala, Panama, Guyana, Mexico, Nicaragua, Venezuela, and Trinidad and Tobago.

Subspecies
 Oncideres albomarginata albomarginata Thomson, 1868
 Oncideres albomarginata chamela Chemsak & Giesbert, 1986

References

albomarginata
Beetles described in 1868